Paquet is a French surname. Notable people with the surname include:

Alain Paquet (born 1961), Canadian politician
Anselme-Homère Pâquet (1830–1891), Canadian physician and politician
Benjamin Pâquet (1832–1900), Canadian priest
Carolanne D'Astous-Paquet (born 1990), Canadian singer
David Paquet, Canadian playwright
Eugène Paquet (1867–1951), Canadian politician
François-Xavier Wurth-Paquet (1801–1885), Luxembourgian politician
Gilles Paquet (born 1936), Canadian economist
Jean-Guy Paquet (born 1938), Canadian scientist and businessman
Kévin Monnet-Paquet (born 1988), French football player
Louis-Honoré Pâquet (1838–1915), Canadian priest and teacher
Philippe Paquet, former French jockey
Thérèse Paquet-Sévigny, Canadian diplomat

See also
15278 Pâquet, an asteroid
Saint-Raymond/Paquet Aerodrome, a Canadian aerodrome
Paquette

French-language surnames